Kim Hak-Man (born 26 March 1976 in South Chungcheong Province) is a South Korean rifle shooter. He competed in the 50 m rifle prone event at the 2012 Summer Olympics, where he placed 15th.  He finished in 28th place in the same event at the 2008 Summer Olympics.

References

1976 births
Living people
South Korean male sport shooters
Olympic shooters of South Korea
Shooters at the 2008 Summer Olympics
Shooters at the 2012 Summer Olympics
Sportspeople from South Chungcheong Province
Asian Games medalists in shooting
Shooters at the 2010 Asian Games
Asian Games gold medalists for South Korea
Medalists at the 2010 Asian Games
South Korean Buddhists
20th-century South Korean people
21st-century South Korean people